Tripolis (meaning "three cities") was a district in ancient Arcadia, Greece consisting of the three cities of Calliae (Calliæ), Dipoena (Dipœna), and Nonacris.

External links
Hazlitt, Classical Gazetteer, "Tripolis"

Geography of ancient Arcadia
Historical regions in Greece